Ruben Gonzales (Highest Doubles Ranking: 131) and Sean Thornley (Highest Doubles Ranking: 160) were the defending champions, but they decided not to participate this year.

André Ghem and Tristan Lamasine won the title, defeating Harri Heliövaara and Patrik Niklas-Salminen 7–6(7–5), 7–6(7–4).

Seeds

Draw

References
 Main Draw

Tampere Open - Doubles
2015 Doubles